Morson's Row, also known as James Morson's Row, is a set of three historic rowhouses located in Richmond, Virginia.  They were built in 1853, and are three-story, three bay brick structures with flat roofs. They feature Italianate style heavy bracketed cornices, arched door enframements, and elaborately molded consoled lintel over the windows. The distinctive feature of the row is the off-center, two-bay bow on each house.

It was listed on the National Register of Historic Places in 1969.

References

Houses on the National Register of Historic Places in Virginia
Italianate architecture in Virginia
Houses completed in 1856
Houses in Richmond, Virginia
National Register of Historic Places in Richmond, Virginia